The Libunao Protected Landscape, also known as the Libunao Spring Protected Landscape, is a protected area in the Ilocos Region of the island of Luzon in the Philippines located on the western foothills of the Ilocos Mountain Range. It protects the Libunao Spring and surrounding forests, as well as the Nagcullooban River watershed. First proclaimed as the Libunao Spring Watershed Forest Reserve in 1931 through Proclamation No. 410 issued by Governor-General Dwight F. Davis, the park was reestablished as a protected landscape area under the National Integrated Protected Areas System in 2000 through Proclamation No. 280 signed by President Joseph Estrada. The Libunao watershed is the source of water supply for domestic use and irrigation of the surrounding farms and communities of northern Ilocos Sur province.

Description
It encompasses parts of the municipalities of Sinait and Cabugao, from the rural Sinait village of Nagcullooban up to the Cabugao sitio of Caset in Barangay Maradodon. It has an average slope of between 18% and 50% steepness with a soil condition consisting of clay loam. It is one of four protected watershed landscape areas in Ilocos Sur.

Libunao is covered primarily with cogon grass and giant reed. Its lowland forest contains some leguminous tree species such as mango, narra, mahogany, bangkal, acacia, ipil-ipil, duhat, akleng parang, elemi, tibig, hauili, anabiong and molave.

See also
 Lidlidda Protected Landscape
 Northern Luzon Heroes Hill National Park

References

Protected landscapes of the Philippines
Springs of the Philippines
Geography of Ilocos Sur
Landforms of Ilocos Sur
Protected areas established in 1931
1931 establishments in the Philippines